Mouhamed Diop (born 30 September 2000) is a Senegalese professional footballer who plays as a midfielder for Moldovan club Sheriff Tiraspol on loan from the Turkish club Kocaelispor.

Career
On 25 July 2022, he signed a contract with Moldovan Super Liga club Sheriff Tiraspol.

References

External links

2000 births
Living people
Association football midfielders
Senegalese footballers
Kocaelispor footballers
TFF First League players
FC Sheriff Tiraspol players
Moldovan Super Liga players
Senegalese expatriate footballers
Expatriate footballers in Turkey
Senegalese expatriate sportspeople in Turkey
Expatriate footballers in Moldova
Senegalese expatriate sportspeople in Moldova